Wellsboro Johnston Airport  is a public non-towered general aviation Airport that is located 4 miles SW of and serves Wellsboro, Pennsylvania.

Facilities and aircraft

Aircraft operations average 109 a week, approximately 5,500 a year. Operations are divided: 53% local general aviation, 44% transient general aviation, 4% air taxi. There are 28 aircraft based on the field: 22 are single engine, 1 muli-engine and 5 ultralights.

See also
 List of airports in Pennsylvania

References

External links

Airports in Pennsylvania
Transportation buildings and structures in Tioga County, Pennsylvania